The 2022–23 New Mexico Lobos men's basketball team represented the University of New Mexico during the 2022–23 NCAA Division I men's basketball season. The Lobos were led by second-year head coach Richard Pitino and were members of the Mountain West Conference. They played their home games at The Pit.

Previous season 
The Lobos finished the 2021–22 season 13–19, 5–12 in Mountain West play to finish in last place. As the No. 9 seed in the Mountain West tournament, they lost in the first round to Nevada 77–85.

Offseason

Departures

Incoming transfers

2022 recruiting class

Roster

Schedule and results 

|-
!colspan=9 style=| Exhibition

|-
!colspan=9 style=| Regular season

|-
!colspan=9 style=| Mountain West tournament

|-
!colspan=12 style=| NIT

Source

References 

New Mexico Lobos men's basketball seasons
New Mexico
New Mexico Lobos men's basketball
New Mexico Lobos men's basketball
New Mexico